Hamadou Evelé (born 15 October 1949) is a Cameroonian athlete. He competed in the men's high jump at the 1972 Summer Olympics.

References

1949 births
Living people
Athletes (track and field) at the 1972 Summer Olympics
Cameroonian male high jumpers
Olympic athletes of Cameroon
Place of birth missing (living people)